Mark Drabenstott is a vice-president of the Federal Reserve Bank of Kansas City and the director of the Center for the Study of Rural America (CSRA). Drabenstott is also chair of the National Policy Association's Food and Agriculture Committee and a director of the National Bureau of Economic Research at Harvard University.

Employment History

Drabenstott joined the bank in 1981 and became a vice-president in 1990. He became director of the CSRA in 1998.

He has served as an advisor for the World Bank and has testified before Congress on at least 10 occasions.

Writings by Mark Drabenstott

 Rural America in a New Century was an October 1999 report by Mark Drabenstott, for the Center for the Study of Rural America's newsletter The Main Street Economist.

In the introduction the report notes that the farm economy is in a deep slump and that there are major economic challenges facing rural communities within the U.S. The second section is titled, "A new farm crisis?" and argues that it is important that the government expands its assistance to rural communities. The article also questions whether concentrated and corporatized agriculture will be beneficial to the majority of rural communities and states, "Agricultural policy no longer cures rural ills."

  "Rethinking Federal Policy for Regional Economic Development"

American bankers
Living people
Harvard University staff
Year of birth missing (living people)
American economists